Cefmatilen (INN, codenamed S-1090) is an orally-active cephalosporin antibiotic. It was developed in Japan and first described in 1992.

In vitro, cefmatilen is highly active against a variety of Gram-positive and Gram-negative bacteria, including  Streptococcus pyogenes and Neisseria gonorrhoeae.

References

Further reading
 

Cephalosporin antibiotics
Ketoximes
Thiazoles
Triazoles